Ducat is a surname. Notable people with the surname include:

Andy Ducat (1886–1942), British cricketer and professional footballer
Arthur Ducat (1830–1896), American Union Army officer and businessman
Benedicto Ducat (born 1957), Filipino impressionist painter
Robert Ducat (born 1969), American Christian music artist
William Ducat (1847–1922), British archdeacon